USS Huntsville was a steamer acquired by the Union Navy during the American Civil War. She was used by the Navy to patrol navigable waterways of the Confederacy to prevent the South from trading with other countries.

Construction and initial service 
Huntsville, a wooden screw steamer, was built in New York City by J. A. Westervelt for H. B. Cromwell & Co., who intended to run her as a passenger steamer between New York and Savannah, Georgia. Huntsville was launched on 10 December 1857, and was in operation on her intended route by January of the following year. 
 
With the outbreak of the Civil War in April 1861, Hunstsville was chartered from her owner, H. B. Cromwell & Co., in New York City 24 April 1861; commissioned there 9 May 1861, Commander Cicero Price in command; and purchased by the Navy 24 August 1861 while on active duty.

Gulf Blockading Squadron 
 
Huntsville sailed for Key West, Florida, arriving 11 May 1861, and joined the Gulf Blockading Squadron. In early August she steamed from the Florida coast westward and almost immediately captured two small schooners off Mobile, Alabama. She cruised on blockade duty from Alabama to Texas, and on 24 December she engaged Florida off Mobile Bay. Following an hour-long gun battle, she turned the blockade runner back into Mobile.
 
Huntsville returned to New York in the spring of 1862, and she decommissioned 5 April. She recommissioned 11 June, Lt. Howard Rogers in command, and returned to blockade duty along the U.S. Gulf Coast. By the end of July she had taken three prizes, Confederate steamers Adela and Reliance and British schooner Agnes, carrying cargoes of cotton, rosin, and other commodities. Before the end of the year, she captured two additional blockade runners, schooners Courier and Ariel, trying to run into Mobile with cargoes of lead, tin, medicines, wines, and coffee.

As the relentless pressure of the blockade against the South continued, the third year of the war proved even more profitable for Huntsville. During 1863 she captured two Confederate ships, Minnie and A. J. Hodge; two British schooners, Surprise and Ascension; and Spanish steamer Union. In addition, she drove two others, Cuba and Eugenia, into the hands of other ships in the blockading fleet and was given partial credit in the capture of Last Trial, a Confederate sloop captured off Key West, Florida, harbor. Among the variety of cargo seized, Huntsville captured 523 bales of cotton, the most valuable commodity in the South; and she prevented a great quantity of supplies, mainly from Havana, Cuba,  and Nassau, Bahamas, from reaching the beleaguered South.

Yellow fever outbreak  
 
During the first part of 1864 Huntsville operated along the coast of Florida and off Cuba. Late in May she sailed to Tampa Bay to support landing forces. An outbreak of yellow fever in near-epidemic proportions struck the Union ships. Huntsville was one of the hardest hit, and the disease felled more than half her crew. Departing Tampa 23 July, she coaled at Key West and reached New York 3 August. Following a period of quarantine, she decommissioned 19 August.

Recommission 
 
Huntsville recommissioned 25 March 1865, Lt. Comdr. Edward F. Devens in command. Departing New York 2 April, she steamed via Mobile and arrived New Orleans, Louisiana, 17 April. There she embarked passengers and prisoners and sailed for New York, arriving Brooklyn Navy Yard 1 May. She departed 14 May; touched at Baltimore, Maryland, to embark 150 men bound for Panama; and arrived Aspinwall, Panama, 30 May. Departing Panama 5 June, she discovered survivors of the wrecked steamer Golden Rule on Roncador Island. She sailed 16 June with 85 members of Golden Rule's crew embarked and arrived New York nine days later.

End-of-war operations and post-war decommissioning 
 
After completing two passenger runs to Boston, Massachusetts, Huntsville escorted monitor Nausset to Philadelphia where she arrived 22 August. She decommissioned there 28 August and was sold at New York City 30 November to Russell Sturgis.

References 
 

Ships of the Union Navy
Steamships of the United States Navy
Gunboats of the United States Navy
American Civil War patrol vessels of the United States
1857 ships